A drifting ice station is a temporary or semi-permanent facility built on an ice floe. During the Cold War the Soviet Union and the United States maintained a number of stations in the Arctic Ocean on floes such as Fletcher's Ice Island for research and espionage, the latter of which were often little more than quickly constructed shacks. Extracting personnel from these stations proved difficult and in the case of the United States, employed early versions of the Fulton surface-to-air recovery system.

Overview

Soviet and Russian-staffed drifting ice stations are research stations built on the ice of the high latitudes of the Arctic Ocean. They are important contributors to exploration of the Arctic. The stations are named "North Pole" (NP;), followed by an ordinal number: North Pole-1, etc. NP drift stations carry out the program of complex year-round research in the fields of oceanology, ice studies, meteorology, aerology, geophysics, hydrochemistry, hydrophysics, and marine biology. On average, an NP station is the host for 600 to 650 ocean depth measurements, 3500 to 3900 complex meteorology measurements, 1200 to 1300 temperature measurements and sea water probes for chemical analysis, and 600 to 650 research balloon launches. Magnetic, ionosphere, ice and other observations are also carried out there. Regular measurements of the ice floe coordinates provide the data on the direction and speed of its drift.

The modern NP drifting ice station resembles a small settlement with housing for polar explorers and special buildings for the scientific equipment. Usually an NP station begins operations in April and continues for two or three years until the ice floe reaches the Greenland Sea. Polar explorers are replaced yearly. Since 1937 some 800 people were drifting at NP stations.

There are two groups of NP stations:
stations, drifting on the pack ice (i.e. relatively thin and short-lived ice): NP-1 through NP-5, NP-7 through NP-17, NP-20, NP-21
stations, drifting on ice islands (glacier fragments, that were split from the shore): NP-6, NP-18, NP-19, NP-22.

All NP stations are organized by the Russian (former Soviet) Arctic and Antarctic Research Institute (AARI).

History

The idea to use the drift ice for the exploration of nature in the high latitudes of the Arctic Ocean came from Fridtjof Nansen, who fulfilled it on Fram between 1893 and 1896. The first stations to use drift ice as means of scientific exploration of the Arctic originated in the Soviet Union in 1937, when the first such station in the world, North Pole-1, started operations.

North Pole-1 was established on 21 May 1937 some 20 km from the North Pole by the expedition into the high latitudes. Sever-1, led by Otto Schmidt. "NP-1" operated for 9 months, during which the ice floe travelled 2,850 kilometres. On 19 February 1938, Soviet ice breakers Taimyr and Murman took off four polar explorers from the station, who immediately became famous in the USSR and were awarded titles Hero of the Soviet Union: hydrobiologist Pyotr Shirshov, geophysicist Yevgeny Fyodorov, radioman Ernst Krenkel and their leader Ivan Papanin.

Since 1954 Soviet NP stations worked continuously, with one to three such stations operating simultaneously each year. The total distance drifted between 1937 and 1973 was over 80,000 kilometres. North Pole-22 is particularly notable for its record drift, lasting nine years. On 28 June 1972 the ice floe with North Pole-19 passed over the North Pole for the first time ever.

During such long-term observations by NP stations numerous important discoveries in physical geography were made such as valuable conclusions on regularities and the connection between processes in the polar region of the Earth's hydrosphere and atmosphere and the deep water Lomonosov Ridge, which crosses the Arctic Ocean, other large features of the ocean bottom's relief, the discovery of two systems of the drift (circular and "wash-out"), and the fact of cyclones' active penetration into the Central Arctic.

The last Soviet NP station, North Pole-31, was closed in July 1991.

In the post-Soviet era, Russian exploration of the Arctic by drifting ice stations was suspended for twelve years. The year 2003 was notable for Russia's return into the Arctic. , three NP stations had carried out scientific measurements and research since then: "NP-32" through "NP-34". The latter was closed on 25 May 2006.

"NP-35" started operations on 21 September 2007 at the point , when flags of Russia and Saint Petersburg were raised there. 22 scientists, led by A.A.Visnevsky are working on the ice floe. Establishment of the station was the third stage of the Arktika 2007 expedition. An appropriate ice floe was searched for from Akademik Fedorov research vessel, accompanied by nuclear icebreaker Rossiya, using MI-8 helicopters, for a week, until an ice floe with an area of 16 square kilometres was found. The ice has since shrunk significantly, however, and the station is now being abandoned ahead of schedule.

Replacement
Since the mid-2000s it became difficult to find a suitable ice floe to station camp on, due to global warming, and several stations had to be evacuated prematurely because of unexpectedly fast thawing of the ice, so in 2008 an idea to replace the ice camps with a drifting research vessel as a station core was proposed. After almost a decade of deliberation, a contract of building the station vessel was awarded to Admiralty Shipyard in Saint Petersburg in 2017. This will take a form of a large self-propelled ice resistant barge of ~10000 tons displacement, getting to the initial point of the mission by itself or with a help of an icebreaker and continuing to drift with the surrounding ice. The barge, intended to function autonomously for 2–3 years, but equipped to be supplied by air or passing icebreakers, and equipped with the required research equipment, is expected to be commissioned in 2020.

Past stations

See also

List of research stations in the Arctic
List of Russian explorers
Soviet Antarctic Expedition
Barneo, one-month tourist ice camp annual since 2002
Icebreaker Sedov
Konstantin Badygin
Operation Coldfeet
Ice Station Zebra

References

Great Soviet Encyclopedia - for some information in the text and in the table
"North Pole" scientific research stations drift characteristics at the Arctic and Antarctic Research Institute - for some information in the table
 - for some milestones in the exploration

External links
Daily Arctic Ocean Rawinsonde Data from Soviet Drifting Ice Stations (1954-1990)  at NSIDC
"NP-2" to "NP-34" drift trajectories a Google Earth file from the Arctic and Antarctic Research Institute, presenting trajectories of the drift of "NP-2" through "NP-34"
 Arctic Drifting Ice Stations Reports (1950-1958) at Dartmouth College Library

Exploration of the Arctic
Polar exploration by Russia and the Soviet Union
Arctic research
Research stations in the Arctic
Russian inventions
Arctic expeditions
Drifting station
North Pole